Fab or FAB may refer to:

Commerce
 Fab (brand), a frozen confectionery
 Fab (website), an e-commerce design web site
 The FAB Awards, a food and beverage award
 FAB Link, a European electricity link
 Flavoured alcoholic beverage or alcopop, alcoholic drinks with circa 3–7% alcohol
 First Abu Dhabi Bank, an Emirati bank
 Semiconductor fabrication plant, a factory that manufactures integrated circuits, etc.
 Flesh and Blood (card game), a fantasy card game (TCG).

Culture
 fab (magazine), a Canadian gay magazine
 "FAB" (song), a song by JoJo featuring Remy Ma from the 2016 album Mad Love
 Fernsehen aus Berlin, a German television station
 Film Advisory Board, an American ratings board
 Fullmetal Alchemist Brotherhood, a Japanese anime

Health and medicine 
 Fragment antigen-binding
 French–American–British classification systems for hematological disease
 Frontal Assessment Battery for the evaluation of executive function

Military 
 Benin Armed Forces
 Brazilian Air Force
 Brazilian Armed Forces
 Bolivian Air Force

People
 Georgie Fab (born 1952), Canadian musician
 Joe Fab (born 1951), American film producer
 Mistah F.A.B. (born 1982), American rapper

Given name 
 Fab Filippo (born 1974), Canadian actor
 Fab Melo (1990–2017), Brazilian basketball player
 Fabrizio Moretti (born 1980), drummer in The Strokes
 Fab Morvan (born 1966), French singer; member of Milli Vanilli

Science and technology
 Fab (semiconductors), a factory where integrated circuits are fabricated
 Fading affect bias
 Fast atom bombardment
 Feminist Approaches to Bioethics
 Fly ash brick
 Floating Action Button, a UI component of Google's Material Design
 Fragment antigen-binding

Sport 
 Angolan Basketball Federation
 Argentina Boxing Federation
 Bolivian Athletics Federation

Transport 
 First Air, a Canadian airline
 Farnborough Airport in Hampshire, England
 Functional airspace block in the European Union

Other uses 
 Annobonese Creole language of Equatorial Guinea, ISO 639-3 code
 Freeport Area of Bataan, in the Philippines
 Cars in the 1960s British science-fiction television series Thunderbirds; see FAB 1

See also
 Fab Four (disambiguation)
 Fabrication (disambiguation)
 Fabulous (disambiguation)